The United States L-class submarines were a class of 11 submarines built 1914–1917, and were the United States Navy's first attempt at designing and building ocean-going submarines. At the time there was a significant gap in long-range submarine design compared with other major navies. The Group 2 L-boats designed by Lake Torpedo Boat Company (L-5 through L-8) were built to slightly different specifications from the other Group 1 L-boats (which were designed by Electric Boat) and are sometimes considered a separate L-5 class.

Service
After service in the Atlantic Flotilla by the Group 1 boats, most required extensive refits at Philadelphia after the USA's entry into the First World War, which reflected the US Navy's then-limited experience in submarine ocean operations. In December 1917, the seven boats were sent to Bantry Bay as Submarine Division 5 for convoy escort and anti-U-boat patrols. The four new Group 2 L-boats later deployed to the Azores in November 1918 as Division 6 to reinforce four K-class submarines sent there in October 1917. While forward deployed, US L-class submarines displayed "AL" pennant numbers to avoid confusion with British L-class submarines.

US submarines did not sink any U-boats in World War I. The class was generally under-powered, but they enjoyed good endurance for patrols in the North Atlantic and in British waters. After the war, the L class were involved in trials of new torpedoes and hydrophone equipment on both the east and west coasts before decommissioning in 1922 and 1923. At least L-3, L-9, and L-11 were re-engined with Busch-Sulzer diesels removed from Lake-built N-boats in 1921. Three Group 1 boats were scrapped in 1922, the four Group 2 Lake boats were scrapped in 1925, and the remainder were scrapped in 1933 under the London Naval Treaty limiting naval armament.

Design
As in previous US designs, the sail was kept small for reduced drag when submerged. For extended surface runs, the sail was augmented with a temporary piping-and-canvas structure (see photo) which took considerable time to deploy and dismantle. This remained standard through the N class, commissioned 1917–1918. Experience in World War I showed that this was inadequate in the North Atlantic weather, and earlier submarines serving overseas in that war (E class through L class) had their bridge structures augmented with a "chariot" shield on the front of the bridge. Starting with the N class, built with lessons learned from overseas experience, US submarines had bridges more suited to surfaced operations in rough weather. Also, in the L class the rotating cap over the torpedo tubes was replaced by shutters that remained standard through the 1950s.

This was the first US submarine class equipped with a deck gun, in this case a 3-inch/23 caliber (76 mm) partially retractable design. L-9 was the first boat built with the gun; L-1 through L-8 had theirs added some time after completion. The gun was retracted vertically, with a round shield that fit in a well in the superstructure that projected into the pressure hull. Most of the barrel protruded from the deck, resembling a stanchion.

Boats in class
The 11 submarines of the L class were:

Group 1 (Electric Boat design)

Group 2 (Lake Torpedo Boat Company design)

See also
 List of submarine classes of the United States Navy

References

Notes

Sources
 
 Gardiner, Robert, Conway's All the World's Fighting Ships 1906–1921 Conway Maritime Press, 1985. .
 Friedman, Norman "US Submarines through 1945: An Illustrated Design History", Naval Institute Press, Annapolis:1995, .
 Silverstone, Paul H., U.S. Warships of World War I (Ian Allan, 1970), .
Navsource.org early diesel submarines page
Pigboats.com L-boats page
ShipbuildingHistory.com Craig Shipbuilding page
DiGiulian, Tony Navweaps.com 3"/23 caliber gun

External links

 
 L class
Submarine classes